The 2008–09 season was the 99th season of competitive football in Germany. It lasted from 1 July 2008 until 30 June 2009.

Diary of the season
5 October 2008 – Jos Luhukay is released from his duties as head coach of Borussia Mönchengladbach after 20 months over a series of bad results. Director of sporting affairs Christian Ziege acts as a caretaker until a new coach has been found.

19 October 2008 – Hans Meyer is introduced as the new head coach of Borussia Mönchengladbach. It is his second spell with the club after a four-year stint between 1999 and 2003.

23 November 2008 – Armin Veh, head coach of defending champions VfB Stuttgart, is sacked after 33 months. Former player Markus Babbel, who has retired after last season, takes over the coaching duties. Babbel is assigned the title of a "teamchef" since he does not own a professional coaching license.

26 March 2009 – Fred Rutten is sacked as head coach of FC Schalke 04 after 9 months. A well-below-expectation season performance, including early exits in the UEFA Cup and DFB-Pokal competitions and a dismal eighth place in the Bundesliga, is cited as the reason.

1 April 2009 – FC Schalke 04 announces that assistant coaches Mike Büskens, Youri Mulder and Oliver Reck will once again act as caretakers for the remainder of the season.

27 April 2009 – Jürgen Klinsmann is released from his duties as FC Bayern Munich head coach. "Endangered minimum season goals" are cited as the cause of his dismissal after ten months. Jupp Heynckes, who coincidentally visits the Bayern match before Klinsmann's exit, and reserves coach Hermann Gerland are appointed as caretakers. Mehmet Scholl is assigned as temporary coach for the 3. Liga reserve team.

6 May 2009 – Felix Magath, manager of championship contenders VfL Wolfsburg, is announced as new FC Schalke 04 manager for the 2009–10 season. Magath signs a four-year contract with the club.

14 May 2009 – Louis van Gaal is confirmed as new head coach of Bayern Munich for the 2009–10 season. Van Gaal, who won the Eredivisie with AZ Alkmaar, signs a two-year contract.

17 May 2009 – Just prior to the last matchday, Michael Frontzeck is ousted as Arminia Bielefeld head coach in a last attempt to save the club from relegation. Jörg Berger is assigned as a caretaker two days later.

21 May 2009 – Friedhelm Funkel announces he resignment after five seasons as Eintracht Frankfurt head coach at the end of the season.

26 May 2009 – Martin Jol, head coach of Hamburger SV, leaves the club for Eredivisie sides Ajax Amsterdam.

28 May 2009 – Hans Meyer announces he retirement as a coach after successfully avoiding relegation with Borussia Mönchengladbach

2 June 2009 – In a surprise move, Christoph Daum skips his last year with 1. FC Köln to become the new head coach of Turkish Süper Lig sides Fenerbahçe.

3 June 2009 – Michael Frontzeck signs a two-year contract as head coach of Borussia Mönchengladbach.

4 June 2009 – Michael Skibbe is appointed as new head coach of Eintracht Frankfurt. Skibbe signs a two-year contract with the club.

5 June 2009 – Bruno Labbadia, head coach of Bayer Leverkusen, leaves the club after just one year and takes over Hamburger SV. Labbadia signs a two-year contract with Hamburg. Jupp Heynckes is named as Labbadia's successor, also signing a two-year contract.

12 June 2009 – Former Bundesliga player Zvonimir Soldo signs a two-year contract as head coach of 1. FC Köln. Soldo enters Cologne after a Prva HNL title with Croatian team Dinamo Zagreb.

Men's national team

Friendly matches

FIFA World Cup 2010 qualifiers
Germany was drawn into Group 4 of UEFA qualification for the 2010 FIFA World Cup.

Women's national team

Friendly matches

Olympic football tournament
Germany ended the Olympic football tournament with the bronze medal.

Group stage

Quarterfinal

Semifinal

Bronze medal match

UEFA Women's Euro 2009 qualifiers
Germany had already qualified for the UEFA Women's Euro 2009 before the start of the season. After the last qualifying match, the team finished with eight wins from eight matches in Group 4.

2009 Algarve Cup
Germany finished the 2009 Algarve Cup as fourth-placed team after losing against Denmark in the match for third place.

Group stage

Match for third place

Honours

League tables

Men

Bundesliga

2. Bundesliga

3. Liga

1. FC Union Berlin were the dominating team in the first season of the newly created third tier of the German league pyramid, winning the championship and promotion to the 2. Bundesliga with four matches to play. The remaining one-and-a-half promotion spots were contested between Fortuna Düsseldorf, Paderborn, and Unterhaching until the last matchday. Since all three teams won their last matches, Düsseldorf gained direct promotion, while Paderborn were to face 2. Bundesliga sides Osnabrück in the 2. Bundesliga relegation playoffs. The third-placed team eventually completed the promotional trio by beating Osnabrück 2–0 on aggregate.

Stuttgarter Kickers were struggling both on and off the pitch and consequently relegated to the fourth-level Regionalliga. After being on bottom of the table for most of the season, the choice not to return a loan from the German FA resulted in a three-point deduction, which effectively ended their season. The second relegated team, VfR Aalen, fell victim to its amount of drawn matches. Fifteen of them, paired with only eight wins, resulted in only 39 points, which proved to be too few to survive.

Wacker Burghausen would originally have been the third team to be relegated. However, they were spared after Kickers Emden, who were a promotion contender for three-quarters of the season, had to return their license over financial problems. Since Emden did not obtain a license for the Regionalliga, they entered the fifth-tier Oberliga Niedersachsen for the 2009–10 season.

Women

Bundesliga

Turbine Potsdam emerged victorious in a very tight championship race, beating runners-up Bayern Munich by just a single goal. A 4–0 defeat against third-placed FCR Duisburg just days before the last matchday of the season proved to be costly for the team from Munich. Long-time successive champion 1. FFC Frankfurt had to battle through a couple of injuries to key players, including Birgit Prinz, and thus finished in fourth place.

The first three teams qualified for the newly created UEFA Women's Champions League, although Duisburg did only so on virtue of their UEFA Women's Cup win. Both Potsdam and Duisburg directly entered the main round of the competition, while Bayern Munich competed in a qualification tournament.

On the bottom side of the table, TSV Crailsheim never had a chance to be competitive, and successfully ended the season with a mere five points in last place. The second relegation place was contested between SC Bad Neuenahr and Borussia Friedenstal. The team from southwestern Germany eventually prevailed and sent Friedenstal back to the 2. Bundesliga after just one year in the top flight.

2. Bundesliga

The northern group was won by Tennis Borussia Berlin. SG Lütgendortmund had to leave the second tier again after just one season. They were accompanied by 1. FC Union Berlin.

The southern group saw a close finish between 1. FC Saarbrücken and VfL Sindelfingen. Saarbrücken eventually prevailed and made their immediate return to the top flight. Wattenscheid 09, who were also relegated from the Bundesliga last season, finished fourth. On the bottom end of the table, SV Dirmingen were relegated with the worst record of all 24 2. Bundesliga teams. They were joined by Viktoria Jägersburg, who made their immediate return to the Regionalliga.

The relegation playoffs featured a match-up between Mellendorf and Löchgau. Both teams were promoted to the second level one year ago. Löchgau eventually retrieved their spot with a 2–1 aggregate victory, sending Mellendorf back to the Regionalliga.

North

South

Movements for the 2009–10 season

Transfer deals

Retirements
The following is a list of retired players who ended their career at the end of the 2008–09 season. All retirements are, unless noted otherwise, listed in the 2009 special edition of kicker magazine. The club given in parentheses is the last club of the retired player.

 End of season – Alexander Bade (Arminia Bielefeld)
 End of season – Frank Baumann (Werder Bremen)
 End of season – Ralf Bucher (SpVgg Unterhaching)
 End of season – Francisco Copado (SpVgg Unterhaching)
 End of season – Christian Fiedler (Hertha BSC)
 End of season – Dennis Grassow (Jahn Regensburg)
 End of season – Marijan Kovačević (VfB Stuttgart)
 End of season – Tobias Rau (Arminia Bielefeld)
 End of season – Bernd Schneider (Bayer Leverkusen)
 End of season – Markus Schroth (1860 Munich)
 End of season – Michael Tarnat (Hannover 96)
 End of season – Marco Vorbeck (FC Augsburg)

Deaths
 12 July 2008 – Reinhard Fabisch, 57, coach for the national teams of Zimbabwe, Kenya and Benin. Fabisch died from cancer.
 13 July 2008 – Rudolf Nafziger, 62, European Cup Winners' Cup winner with Bayern Munich in 1967. He also played for Swiss club FC St. Gallen, Hannover 96 and Austrian sides LASK Linz. Nafziger earned one cap for West Germany.
 24 August 2008 – Josef Marx, 73, defender for SV Sodingen and Karlsruher SC. He earned one cap for West Germany.
 29 August 2008 – Heinz Wewers, 81, midfielder for Rot-Weiß Essen. Wewers earned twelve caps for West Germany.
 31 August 2008 – Albert Sing, 91, Stuttgarter Kickers player and manager of various German and Swiss teams. He earned nine caps for Germany.
 19 October 2008 – Willi Kraus, 65, striker for FC Schalke 04, Tennis Borussia Berlin, and Eintracht Gelsenkirchen.
 27 October 2008 – Heinz Krügel, 87, player for SG Planitz and coach of the East Germany national team and 1. FC Magdeburg. Krügel won the UEFA Cup Winners' Cup with Magdeburg in 1974.
 25 November 2008 – Günter Männig, 80, referee. Männig was on the FIFA list between 1962 and 1978 and was assigned to 92 matches in that span. He also worked 264 matches in the DDR-Oberliga and the FDGB-Pokal. 
 27 December 2008 – Alfred Pfaff, 82, midfielder for Eintracht Frankfurt. Pfaff was part of the German 1954 World Cup team. He earned seven caps for West Germany.
 12 January 2009 – Michael Polywka, 65, player for FC Carl Zeiss Jena, Eintracht Braunschweig and Hannover 96.
 29 January 2009 – Willi Köchling, 84, player for Rot-Weiß Essen. He earned one cap for West Germany.
 28 April 2009  – Fritz Gödicke, 89, coach of the East Germany national team between May 1958 and August 1959.

References

 
Seasons in German football